Thrall Independent School District is a public school district based in Thrall, Texas (USA) and covers eastern Williamson County.  Thrall ISD serves approximately 810 students in grades PK-12th Grade.

Schools
The district has three campuses - 
Thrall High School (Grades 9-12)
Thrall Middle School (Grades 5-8)
Thrall Elementary School (Grades PK-4)

In 2022, Thrall ISD is rated as an "A" Rated district by the Texas Education Agency.

References

External links
Thrall ISD

School districts in Williamson County, Texas